Guatemala–Spain refers to the current and historical relations between Guatemala and Spain. Both nations are members of the Organization of Ibero-American States and the United Nations.

History

Spanish conquest

The first Spanish troops to arrive to Guatemala were led by Spanish conquistador Pedro de Alvarado in 1524. On arrival to Guatemala, the Spaniards discovered various Maya speaking and Nahua speaking polities within the territory. The Spaniards, with help of indigenous allies and Aztec troops, began to slowly conquer the peoples of Guatemala. The first and major battles involved the K'iche' people who were defeated in March 1524 and resulted in the capture of the K'iche' capital of Q'umarkaj. In 1525, Spanish conquistador of the Aztec Empire, Hernán Cortés arrived to Petén to subdue the rebellious Cristóbal de Olid who had been sent to conquer Honduras. Cortés soon returned to New Spain after the battles.

Soon after the conquest of southern Guatemala, the Spanish, in 1557 founded the city Santiago de los Caballeros de Guatemala which was to be the capital of the Captaincy General of Guatemala. Spanish missionaries soon began to Guatemala to convert the native indigenous people to Catholicism. In March 1697, the Spanish fully conquered all of Guatemala for Spain after the conquest of Petén. The Captaincy General of Guatemala became part of New Spain and was governed by the Viceroy of New Spain based in Mexico City.

Independence

In 1808, Joseph Bonaparte was installed as King of Spain and several Spanish American colonies began to declare their independence from Spain. As Guatemala and most Central American nations were governed by Mexico City; New Spain declared its independence from Spain in 1810. In 1821, the Plan of Iguala which declared Mexico as a constitutional monarchy. Guatemala declared its own independence from Spain on 15 September 1821 and chose to join the Mexican Empire under Emperor Agustín de Iturbide.

In March 1823, Iturbide resigned as Emperor and Mexico became a republic. Guatemala decided to separate from Mexico on 1 July 1823. Guatemala, along with El Salvador, Honduras, Nicaragua and Costa Rica formed the Federal Republic of Central America (with the exception of the Guatemala province of Chiapas which choose to remain part of Mexico in July 1824). In 1839 the Central American Federation dissolved and Guatemala became an independent nation.

Post-Independence
In May 1863, Guatemala and Spain signed a Treaty of Peace, Friendship and Recognition. During the 1920s, several hundred Spaniards immigrated to Guatemala. In 1960, Guatemala entered into a civil war between the government and various leftist rebel groups supported chiefly by ethnic Maya indigenous people and Ladino peasants. In September 1977, King Juan Carlos I of Spain paid an official visit to Guatemala, his first and only trip as King to the country.

Burning of the Spanish Embassy in Guatemala
In the early morning of 31 January 1980, a group of Guatemalan peasants from the Committee for Peasant Unity, joined by workers and students, entered the Spanish Embassy in Guatemala City. The protesters announced that they had come to the embassy peacefully and that they would hold a press conference to state their grievances against the Guatemalan government. The protesters choose to enter the Spanish embassy as Spain had been sympathetic towards their cause. At the time the protesters entered, the Spanish Ambassador, Máximo Cajal López was meeting with former Guatemalan Vice-President Eduardo Rafael Cáceres Lehnhoff at the embassy.

The Spanish Ambassador met with the protesters and announced to the government that they hope for a peaceful negotiation to take place. Guatemalan President Fernando Romeo Lucas Garcia and police and government officials immediately met at the National Palace and decided to remove the protesters by force from the embassy. Just before noon that same day, 300 armed state agents surrounded the building and cut the electricity, water and telephone lines. The armed agents entered the building and began to shoot at the protesters who ran to barricade themselves in the various offices. During the commotion, a fire broke out on the second floor of the embassy. As the fire blazed, the police refused to allow volunteers and firefighters to enter the building to save those trapped on the second floor. 37 people died during the fire, including the former Vice-President Cáceres Lehnhoff and Vicente Menchú, father of future Nobel Peace Prize laureate, Rigoberta Menchú, as well protesters and Spanish embassy employees. There were only two survivors for the fire, the Spanish Ambassador who narrowly escaped and protester Gregorio Yujá Xona. Both were taken to Herrera Llerandi Hospital for treatment.

On 1 February, 20 armed men entered the hospital and kidnapped Gregorio Yujá Xona. His dead body was later found tortured. On him was a sign stating that the Spanish Ambassador Máximo Cajal López was next. The Ambassador, with assistance from the diplomatic staff left the hospital and fled the country. On 2 February 1980, Spain severed diplomatic relations with Guatemala over the incident at the embassy and the threat on its diplomatic staff.

In September 1984, Guatemala and Spain re-established diplomatic relations. In 1999, Rigoberta Menchú presented charges for torture, genocide, illegal detention and state-sponsored terrorism against former President Ríos Montt and four other retired Guatemalan generals, two of them ex-presidents in Spain as Spain's Constitutional Court ruled in 2005 that Spanish courts can try those accused of crimes against humanity even if the victims were not of Spanish origin. In July 2006, a Spanish judge ordered an arrest warrant for Ríos Montt and others accused of genocide.

Bilateral relations
Guatemala and Spain have signed numerous bilateral agreements and treaties, such as an Extradition Treaty (1895); Agreement on the Protection of Industries and Trade (1925); Agreement on Dual-Nationality (1961); Cultural Agreement (1964); Agreement on the elimination of Tourist Visas (1968); Air Transportation Agreement (1971); Agreement on Technical Cooperation (1977); Agreement on Educational, Cultural and Sports Cooperation (1989) and an Agreement on the Protection of Investments (1999).

Cultural cooperation
Guatemala hosts a Spanish Cultural Center in Guatemala City and a Spanish Cooperation Training Center in Antigua Guatemala.

Transportation
There are direct flights between Guatemala and Spain with the following airlines: Iberia and Wamos Air.

Trade

In 2018, trade between Guatemala and Spain totaled €369 million Euros. Guatemala's main exports to Spain include: tuna, shrimp, zinc, sugar, rum and coffee. Spain's main exports to Guatemala include: machinery, medicine, food products, electrical equipment and steel. Spain is Guatemala's fifth largest foreign investor (after the United States, Canada, Mexico and Colombia). In 2018, Spanish investments in Guatemala totaled US$31 million. Spanish multinational companies such as Mapfre, Telefónica and Zara operate in Guatemala.

Resident diplomatic missions
 Guatemala has an embassy in Madrid.
 Spain has an embassy in Guatemala City.

See also 
 Burning of the Spanish Embassy
 Immigration to Spain
 Spanish immigration to Guatemala

References 

 
Spain
Guatemala
Relations of colonizer and former colony